This is the list of episodes for The Late Late Show with Craig Ferguson in 2007.

2007

January

February

March

April

May

June

July

August

September

October

November

There were no other episodes produced in November due to the 2007–08 Writers Guild of America strike.

December
There were no episodes produced in December due to the 2007–08 Writers Guild of America strike.

References

External links
 Craig Ferguson on Twitter
 The Late Late Show with Craig Ferguson at CBS
 The Late Late Show with Craig Ferguson on Twitter
 The Late Late Show with Craig Ferguson on Facebook